Treymain Spry (born 29 August 1999) is an Australian professional rugby league footballer who plays as a er for the Tweed Heads Seagulls in the Queensland Cup.

He previously played for the Gold Coast Titans in the National Rugby League.

Background
Born in Ipswich, Queensland, Spry, who is of Torres Strait Islander descent, played his junior rugby league for the Goodna Eagles and attended Redbank Plains State High School and Ipswich State High School before being signed by the Sydney Roosters.

Playing career
In 2015, Spry played for the Ipswich Jets Cyril Connell Cup team. In 2016, he moved up to the club's Mal Meninga Cup team, playing two seasons with the side. In 2017, he represented the Queensland under-18 team in their 28–35 loss to New South Wales.

In 2018, Spry joined the Sydney Roosters Jersey Flegg Cup side, scoring 11 tries in 17 games. In 2019, returned to Queensland, signing with the Gold Coast Titans for two years. Despite still being eligible for the under-20s, he spent the entirety of the 2019 season playing for the Tweed Heads Seagulls in the Queensland Cup, scoring nine tries in 20 games. In July 2019, he represented the Queensland under-20 team.

2020
In Round 9 of the 2020 NRL season, Spry made his NRL debut against the New Zealand Warriors.

Assault
On March 24, 2022, it was revealed Treymain Spry had been assaulted in Brisbane two weeks prior after being hit by another male. This caused a fractured skull and a brain bleed to Spry. He has since been recovering at home.

References

External links
Gold Coast Titans profile
NRL profile

1999 births
Living people
Australian rugby league players
Indigenous Australian rugby league players
Gold Coast Titans players
Tweed Heads Seagulls players
Rugby league wingers
Rugby league players from Ipswich, Queensland